Malonno is a town and comune in the province of Brescia, in Lombardy, northern Italy. Neighbouring communes are Berzo Demo, Paisco Loveno and Sonico. It is located on the right bank of the river Oglio, in the Val Camonica.

References

Cities and towns in Lombardy